Sanat Naft Abadan Football Club (Bāshgāh-e Futbāl-e San'at Naft-e Ābādān) is an Iranian football club based in Abadan, Iran. They currently play in the Persian Gulf Pro League after being promoted from the Azadegan League in the 2015–2016 season. The team is sponsored by Iran's national petroleum industry and is part of the sports club Sanat Naft Athletic Club. Sanat Naft has a reserve team, Sanat Naft Novin who currently compete in the 2nd Division.

Despite their lack of success in past years, they are still heavily supported by the people of Abadan, and have cemented a place in Iran's football history.

Club history

Establishment and early years
Prior to the establishment of the Takhte Jamshid League in 1972, the people of Abadan mostly followed two clubs, Kargar FC and Jam FC. Kargar had been established by workers from Abadan's oil refinery. Ten years later, Parviz Dehdari along with some of his classmates at Razi School established Jam FC. These teams had a large number of fans until 1972.
When the Takhte Jamshid League was established, the city of Abadan was given one spot. The club was to be managed by Iran's oil industry. Fans were immediately drawn to the team, as it would be competing in Iran's top football league. Many of the better players from Kargar and Jam moved to Sanat Naft.
The club's original kit colors were white, blue and black. The city of Abadan and the Khūzestān Province had very technical players and the club adapted a style of play similar to the Brazil of the 1970s after Parviz Dehdari became the chairman of the club. To emphasize their admiration for Brazilian football, the club changed its team colors to yellow, blue and white, similar to that of the Brazilian national team. The club's nickname, Iran's Brazil, soon appeared.

Post revolution
Football was extremely popular in Abadan, and the number of fans was growing everyday, but everything stopped when the Iranian Revolution took place in 1978. Football was no longer a priority, and it was shoved even farther out of the limelight when the Iran–Iraq War began in 1980. Abadan and Khuzestan were heavily hit during the war. Abadan's massive refinery was shut down, and hundreds of thousands left the city. From 1980 to 1988 the club was based in Shiraz. Once in Shiraz, the club had to start from Iran's third division, but was able to make it back to the top flight with the help of its players. Since many natives of Abadan had left the city during the war for other cities, fan support for the club was always good no matter where the team was playing.

After the war the club went back to Abadan, but due to the war's negative effects on the city and poor management in the football club, Sanat Naft has not been able to have any major success.

Iran Pro League
Sanat Naft were present in Iran's Azadegan League until the 2001–02 season when they were relegated. They made it back to the Iran Pro League in 2002, but the club was relegated the same season.

Portuguese coach Acácio Casimiro signed a one–year deal as head coach of Sanat Naft on 18 June 2006 but was later replaced by Ebrahim Ghasempour. After Sanat Naft was promoted to the Iran Pro League they were immediately relegated the same season under head coach Ahmad Tousi. Tousi took over for Ghasempour as he was sacked after 20 games. The club was in last place with only 16 point to show under Ghasempour with a record of 4 wins 4 ties and 12 losses. In the next 14 games under Tousi the club went 5 wins with 4 ties and 5 losses with a total of 19 point.

2005 promotion controversy
Sanat Naft made it to the promotion playoffs in the 2004–05 season. Until the final game of the promotion playoffs, Sanat Naft was in second place and head of Rah Ahan on goal difference. On the last day despite Sanat Naft's win against Payam Mashhad, Rah Ahan defeated Shahid Ghandi by a score of 6–1 to finish second, ahead of Sanat Naft on goal difference.

Sanat Naft officials immediately suggested that Shahid Ghandi had allowed Rah Ahan to win by such a huge score. Sanat Naft was not able to prove this allegation with evidence. Later Sanat Naft claimed that Rah Ahan had used an ineligible player; this went through several courts and Rah Ahan was found guilty.

Two seasons later Sanat Naft was automatically awarded a promotion spot to the Persian Gulf Pro League starting in the 2007–08 season.
They could not stay in league and were relegated at the end of the season.

Return to the Persian Gulf Pro League
After spending two years in the Azadegan League the club was again promoted to the Iran Pro League in 2010. In their first year Sanat Naft finished a respectable ninth place. The following year the club again finished in a respectable 10th place. Before the 2012–13 Iran Pro League season there were high expectations for Sanat Naft. The club was a major disappointment and finished 16th and was relegated back to the Azadegan League.

After a few seasons in the lower division, in the 2015–16 season after a last day 2–1 win against third place team Fajr Sepasi, Sanat Naft returned to the top flight after a three-year absence.

Players

First-team squad

 

For recent transfers, see List of Iranian football transfers summer 2022''.

Managers

Club management

Statistics and records 
The player records section includes details of the club's leading goalscorers and those who have made most appearances in first-team competitions.

(As of 23 July 2021)

Top goalscorers

Honours
Azadegan League
Runners–up (2): 2001–02, 2009–10

Notes

External links

Official
 Official club website 
 Player and Results 

 
Football clubs in Iran
Association football clubs established in 1972
Abadan, Iran
1972 establishments in Iran
Sport in Khuzestan Province